Olyokma is a rural locality (a settlement) in Olyokminsky Selsoviet of Tyndinsky District, Amur Oblast, Russia. The population was 462 as of 2018. There is 1 street.

Geography 
Olyokma is located 446 km northwest of Tynda (the district's administrative centre) by road. Khani is the nearest rural locality.

References 

Rural localities in Tyndinsky District